The PMPC Star Award for Best Gag Show is given to the best television sketch comedy of the year.

Winners

1990: Sick O'Clock News (IBC 13)

1991: Mongolian Barbecue (IBC 13)

1992: Mongolian Barbecue (IBC 13)

1993: Mongolian Barbecue (RPN 9)

1994: Mixed N.U.T.S. (GMA 7)

1995: Tropang Trumpo (ABC 5)

1996: Bubble Gang (GMA 7)

1997: Bubble Gang (GMA 7)

1998: Bubble Gang (GMA 7)

1999: Bubble Gang (GMA 7)

2000: Bubble Gang (GMA 7)

2001: Bubble Gang (GMA 7)

2002: Bubble Gang (GMA 7)

2003: Bubble Gang (GMA 7)

2004: Bubble Gang (GMA 7)

2005: Bubble Gang (GMA 7) & Goin' Bulilit (ABS-CBN 2) [tied]

2006: Bubble Gang (GMA 7)

2007: Bubble Gang (GMA 7)

2008: Goin' Bulilit (ABS-CBN 2)

2009: Banana Split (ABS-CBN 2) & Bubble Gang (GMA 7) [tied]

2010: Banana Split (ABS-CBN 2)

2011: Bubble Gang (GMA 7)

2013: Banana Split: Extra Scoop (ABS-CBN 2) & Bubble Gang (GMA 7) [tied]

2014: Goin' Bulilit (ABS-CBN 2) & Bubble Gang (GMA 7) - Hall of Famer (15 times)

2015: Banana Split: Extra Scoop (ABS-CBN 2)

2016: Goin' Bulilit (ABS-CBN 2)

2017: Goin' Bulilit (ABS-CBN 2)

2018: Goin' Bulilit (ABS-CBN 2)

Multiple winners
15 awards
 Bubble Gang (consecutive)

6 awards
 Goin' Bulilit (consecutive)

4 awards
 Banana Split (consecutive)

3 awards
 Mongolian Barbecue (consecutive)

PMPC Star Awards for Television